What's Your Name is a compilation album by American rock band Lynyrd Skynyrd. It was certified gold and platinum by the RIAA in July 2001.

Track listing 

"That Smell" (Allen Collins, Ronnie Van Zant) – 5:49
"Workin' for MCA" (Ed King, Van Zant) – 4:48
"Call Me the Breeze" (J.J. Cale) – 5:09
"Mississippi Kid" (Al Kooper, Van Zant, Bob Burns) – 3:57
"What's Your Name?" (Gary Rossington, Van Zant) – 3:33
"Simple Man" (Rossington, Van Zant) – 5:58
"Things Goin' On" (Rossington, Van Zant) – 5:00
"I Need You" (King, Rossington, Van Zant) – 6:53
"Swamp Music" (King, Van Zant) – 3:33
"Sweet Home Alabama" (King, Rossington, Van Zant) – 4:45

Tracks 1 and 5 from Street Survivors (1977)
Tracks 2–3 and 8–10 from Second Helping (1974)
Tracks 4 and 6–7 from (Pronounced 'Lĕh-'nérd 'Skin-'nérd) (1973)

Certifications

References 

1997 greatest hits albums
Lynyrd Skynyrd compilation albums